State Route 56 (SR 56) is an inverted question mark-shaped state highway that travels south-to-north,  with a western loop around Vidalia. The route connects the Reidsville and Augusta areas, via Swainsboro and Waynesboro.

Route description
SR 56 begins at an intersection with US 280/SR 30 (West Brazell Street) in Reidsville, in Tattnall County. It travels to the west, crossing over the Ohoopee River, and enters Toombs County. A short distance after entering the county, the highway curves to the southwest. In New Branch, it intersects SR 178. In Toombs Central is US 1/SR 4. The highway continues to the southwest, before curving to the west-northwest. Then, it crosses into Montgomery County and enters Uvalda. In Uvalda, SR 56 intersects US 221/SR 135. South of this intersection, US 221/SR 135 run concurrent toward Hazlehurst. In Uvalda, SR 135 splits off, and US 221/SR 56 travel to the north-northwest to Mt. Vernon, where they have a second intersection with US 280/SR 30 (Spring Street). After leaving town, US 221/SR 56 travel north to an intersection with the southern terminus of SR 199. West of Tarrytown, they cross into Treutlen County, before entering Soperton. In town, they turn to the northeast. In the main part of town, they intersect SR 15/SR 29 (Main Street). At this intersection, SR 15 joins the concurrency for a short while. The three routes intersect SR 78 (Louisiana Street). Here SR 15/SR 78 head to the northwest, while SR 78 heads southeast. A short distance farther to the northeast, they intersect SR 46 (Metter Road). Just over  after leaving town, they intersect the northern terminus of SR 227. Just before an interchange with Interstate 16 (I-16; Jim Gillis Historic Savannah Parkway), the two highways have an intersection with SR 86. They curve to the north-northeast and enter Gillis Springs, where US 221/SR 56 intersect the southern terminus of SR 171. Here, US 221/SR 171 head to the north, while SR 56 departs to the east. Then, it curves to the north-northeast and cross over the Ohoopee River for a second time, crossing into Emanuel County. It heads north, curves to the northeast, and crosses over the Little Ohoopee River. The highway continues to the northeast and intersects US 1/SR 4 (South Main Street), just before entering Swainsboro. There, it intersects US 80/SR 26 (West Main Street)/SR 57 (Kight Road). The four highways run concurrent to the northeast. At the intersection with US 1 Business/SR 4 Business (Main Street), SR 57 splits off to the southeast, along US 1 Business/SR 4 Business south. Approximately  later, SR 56 splits off to the north-northeast. It passes through Modoc and meets SR 192 in Summertown. Farther to the northeast, it crosses over the Ogeechee River into Burke County and Midville. In town, it intersects SR 17 (Lee Street). A few blocks later, it meets the southern terminus of SR 305 (Jones Street). Leaving town, it heads north-northeast and curves to the northeast. SR 56 passes through rural areas of the county toward Waynesboro. Just before it enters town, it intersects SR 24/SR 80. The three routes head east-northeast into town and curve to the northeast to an intersection with US 25/SR 121 (Liberty Street). At this intersection, SR 24 departs to the south-southeast, while SR 56/SR 80 continue through town. Just before leaving Waynesboro, they meet US 25 Bypass/SR 121 Bypass. The two routes curve to the north-northeast, to the point where SR 56 and SR 80 split apart. SR 56 continues to the north-northeast and curves to the north-northwest. It curves back to the north-northeast and intersects the northern terminus of SR 23. Then, it curves around Southland Timber Lake, and meets the western terminus of SR 56 Spur (River Road). The highway crosses over McBean Creek into Richmond County and Augusta. It heads north and northwest, to meet the southern terminus of the now decommissioned SR 56 Spur (Tobacco Road), which leads to Augusta Regional Airport. North-northwest of here is an interchange with I-520 (Bobby Jones Expressway). The route continues to the north-northwest, and curves to the northwest, until it meets its northern terminus, a second intersection with US 25/SR 121 (Peach Orchard Road) in the southern part of Augusta.

The only portion of SR 56 that is part of the National Highway System, a system of routes determined to be the most important for the nation's economy, mobility, and defense, is the portion in Augusta that is north of Tobacco Road.

History

Major intersections

Special routes

Burke County spur route

State Route 56 Spur (SR 56 Spur) is a  spur route that exists entirely within the northeastern part of Burke County. It is known as River Road for its entire length.

It begins at an intersection with the SR 56 mainline, just southeast of McBean. Then, it curves to the east-southeast for most of its route. It crosses over Boggy Gut Creek on an unnamed bridge. Finally, it heads southeast to meet its eastern terminus, an intersection with the eastern terminus of SR 80, northeast of Shell Bluff.

Augusta spur route

State Route 56 Spur (SR 56 Spur) was a  spur route of SR 56 that existed entirely within the southeastern part of Richmond County and the city limits of Augusta. Its west–east section was part of Tobacco Road. It was known as Doug Barnard Parkway for the rest of its length.

Its southern terminus was at an intersection with the SR 56 mainline (Mike Padgett Highway), where Tobacco Road continues past the spur's terminus. It traveled east on Tobacco Road. Then, at the eastern terminus of Tobacco Road, it turned north onto Doug Barnard Parkway. This was at the main entrance to Augusta Regional Airport. The highway paralleled the western edge of the airport before curving to the northwest. Then, it had an interchange with Interstate 520 (I-520; Bobby Jones Expressway). After a crossing over Rocky Creek, a curve to the northeast, and a crossing over Butler Creek, it had a curve to the northwest just before it met its northern terminus, an intersection with US 1/US 25/US 78/US 278/SR 10/SR 121 (Gordon Highway) in the central part of Augusta. Here, the roadway continues as Molly Pond Road.

The highway was decommissioned in 2014.

See also

References

External links

 Georgia Roads (Routes 41 - 60)

056
Transportation in Tattnall County, Georgia
Transportation in Toombs County, Georgia
Transportation in Montgomery County, Georgia
Transportation in Treutlen County, Georgia
Transportation in Emanuel County, Georgia
Transportation in Burke County, Georgia
Transportation in Richmond County, Georgia
Transportation in Augusta, Georgia